Reagan is a 2011 American documentary film, written and directed by Eugene Jarecki, covering the life and presidency of Ronald Reagan. The documentary was aired as part of the centennial anniversary of Reagan's birth, and screened at the 2011 Sundance Film Festival. The film includes interviews with and commentary by several people who worked in Reagan's White House.

It was reviewed favorably by New York Times columnist Bob Herbert, who wrote, "Mr. Jarecki’s documentary does a first-rate job of respectfully separating the real from the mythical, the significant from the nonsense."

References

External links
 
 

2011 films
American documentary films
Documentary films about presidents of the United States
Films about Ronald Reagan
Films directed by Eugene Jarecki
2010s English-language films
2010s American films